Henry Albert Allen (1898–1976) was an English professional footballer of the 1920s. Born in Hackney, he joined Gillingham from Southend United in 1923 and went on to make six appearances for the club in The Football League. He left to join Charlton Athletic in 1924.

References

1898 births
1976 deaths
Footballers from Hackney, London
English footballers
Association football forwards
Gnome Athletic F.C. players
Southend United F.C. players
Gillingham F.C. players
Charlton Athletic F.C. players
Grays Thurrock United F.C. players
English Football League players